A Professional Traffic Operations Engineer (PTOE) is a certification sponsored by the Transportation Professional Certification Board, Inc., and promulgated by the Institute of Transportation Engineers.  The certification process, which has been adopted for professional traffic operations engineers, requires that the holder be a licensed professional engineer if he or she practices in the United States, Canada or any other country that provides governmental licensing of engineers. This certification process builds on and supports the practice of professional engineering registration. The PTOE is the highest leveling licensing available in the field of Traffic Engineering. As of November 29, 2022, there are 3,767 licensed PTOEs worldwide, 3,562 of whom are located in the United States.

Requirements 
A Professional Traffic Operations Engineer (PTOE) must meet all of the following requirements:
 Have four years of Professional Traffic Operations Engineering experience;
 Hold a valid license issued by a state, province, or other governmental body to engage in the practice of civil, mechanical, electrical, or general engineering if he or she resides in a jurisdiction that issues such licenses.  
 Take and attain a passing score on the Professional Traffic Operations Engineer® exam; and 
 Have paid the application/examination fee and the three-year certification fee

Exam topics
The 150-question certification examination currently includes the following topics:

See also 
 Traffic engineering (transportation)
 Regulation and licensure in engineering
 Professional transportation planner

References 

Professional certification in engineering